Amouage is an international luxury fragrance brand founded in 1983 in Oman and operated by the Oman Perfumery LLC, a subsidiary of the Omani SABCO Group.

History 
The company was founded, at the request of Sultan Qaboos bin Said al Said, in 1983 in Muscat, Oman by Prince Sayyid Hamad bin Hamoud Al Busaidi.
In 2006, David Crickmore was appointed CEO. Christopher Chong was the creative director. Crickmore and Chong resigned in 2019. In recent years, Amouage has expanded its range to include bath, home and leather goods.

Locations and manufacturing 
There are 21 standalone Amouage shops, and their products are sold in department stores around the world.

Amouage’s visitors center and factory, located in Muscat has the capacity to produce approximately 25,000 bottles a week. The two-story building opened in December 2012 and is open to visitors.

References

Fragrance companies
Cosmetics companies of Oman
Companies based in Muscat, Oman
Companies established in 1983
Luxury brands
Omani brands